Anthony Leardi is a Canadian politician, who was elected to the Legislative Assembly of Ontario in the 2022 provincial election. He represents the riding of Essex as a member of the Progressive Conservative Party of Ontario. He is the first Progressive Conservative member for the area since 1959. Previously, Leardi served as the Deputy Mayor of Amherstburg, Ontario.

Biography 
Anthony Leardi is a lawyer with 23 years of experience, holding a undergraduate degree in History from McGill University, an undergraduate degree in Education from the University of Windsor, and a law degree from Western University. He is married to Jackie Leardi and has three children.

Member of Provincial Parliament 
Leardi currently serves as the Parliamentary Assistant to the Minister of Mines. He is also a member of the Standing Committee on the Interior.

Electoral record

References 

Living people
Progressive Conservative Party of Ontario MPPs
21st-century Canadian politicians
Year of birth missing (living people)